The 30th European Women's Artistic Gymnastics Championships was held from 12 to 18 May 2014 at the Arena Armeec in Sofia, Bulgaria.

Schedule
The competition schedule is as follows (all times are local, EEST, UTC+03:00).

Wednesday, 14 May 2014
10:00 – 19:30 Junior team final and individual qualifying competition

Thursday, 15 May 2014
10:00 – 19:30 Senior qualifying competition

Friday, 16 May 2014
15:00 – 17:00 Junior all-around final

Saturday, 17 May 2014
15:00 – 16:40 Senior team final

Sunday, 18 May 2014
09:30 – 11:50 Junior individual event finals
14:00 – 16:20 Senior individual event finals

Medalists

Senior Results

Team Competition

Vault

Uneven Bars

Balance Beam

Floor

Junior Results

Team Competition
The junior team competition served as qualification to the all-around and individual event finals. The results of the top 8 teams are below. The other competing teams were Austria, Azerbeijan, Belarus, Bulgaria, Croatia, Czech Republic, Cyprus, Denmark, Finland, Georgia, Greece, Hungary, Iceland, Ireland, Israël, Latvia, Lithuania, Luxembourg, the Netherlands, Norway, Poland, Portugal, Slovakia, Slovenia, Spain, Sweden, Ukraine and Turkey.      
Each country could have 5 junior gymnasts in the team, 4 of which competed at each apparatus. The best 3 scores were counted for the results.

Individual All-Around

Vault

Uneven Bars

Balance Beam

Floor

Qualification

Seniors

Team Competition

Vault

Uneven Bars

Balance Beam

Floor

Juniors

Individual All-Around

Vault

Uneven Bars

Balance Beam

Floor

Medal Count

Combined

Seniors

Juniors

Entries
National associations began announcing their selections in 2014.

Start List

Senior Qualification

Senior Team Final

Senior Event Final

Junior Team Final

Junior All-Around Final

Junior Event Final

References

External links
 }
 Downloads site at the European Union of Gymnastics
 }

European Women's Artistic Gymnastics Championships
Gymnastics
2014 in Bulgarian sport
Sports competitions in Sofia
International gymnastics competitions hosted by Bulgaria
European Artistic Gymnastics Championships
2014 in women's gymnastics
2014 in Bulgarian women's sport